Afridi is a surname. Notable people with the surname include:
 Ashfaq Afridi (born 1987), Pakistani cricketer
 Ayub Afridi (drug lord), Pakistani drug lord
 Ayub Afridi (politician), Pakistani senator
 Latif Afridi (born 1943), Pakistani lawyer and politician
 Khatir Afridi (born 1929), Pakistani poet
 Shaheen Afridi (born 2000), Pakistani cricketer
 Shahid Afridi, Pakistani cricketer
 Shakil Afridi, Pakistani physician who allegedly helped the CIA locate Osama bin Laden
 Shehryar Khan Afridi, Pakistani politician 
 Zeek Afridi, Pakistani singer